Shane Dalton is a member of St Vincents GAA Club in Marino Dublin. He originally started his playing career with St Monicas, Edenmore and joined St Vincents at the age of 16. He was a senior dual player for both his club St Vincents and his county Dublin. He played minor, Under 21 and senior in hurling and Gaelic football for Dublin. He was mainly a forward but has also played at midfield. He is one of the last club players in Dublin to achieve honours at championship level in both codes (Hurling and Gaelic Football) at Minor, Under 21 and Senior level. He is one of the few players that has won adult championships in four decades starting from the 80s, right through to 2010 winning a junior hurling championship. At Inter-County level he started his playing career in 1978 with Dublin Under 13 hurling team and finished playing with the Dublin Masters Gaelic Football team in 2009. In that game in 1978 in an Inter City Schools game when Dublin Under 13s played Cork at Croke Park there were some notable personalities who played on both teams that day. In the hurling game you had former soccer World Cup heroes in Niall Quinn at number 14 and Denis Irwin for Cork in at number 5. Jim Stynes the Australian Rules footballer and Brian Mooney professional footballer with Liverpool  playing in the football decider. He played with the Dublin Senior hurlers making his debut against Tipperary in October 1983 with his last game against Westmeath in 1999, winning two Division 2 National League hurling medals in 1989 and 1997 and losing a Leinster final against Offaly in 1990. He played with the Dublin Senior footballers for two years being a sub against Meath in 1991 in one of the most iconic games ever in the GAA. It was the biggest attendance ever for a Championship game that took four games to decide who would advance to the next round in the Leinster Championship.

He has also another rare distinction in capturing the New York hurling and New York football senior championships on the same day with the same club Westmeath in 1996 scoring 1:10 in the replayed hurling decider (scoring 1:12 in the first game) and 0:03 in the football. He thus became the highest ever scorer in a New York GAA hurling or football decider amassing 2:22 in both hurling games.(unverified claim).
He has represented Leinster from 1988 - 1990 and one of a few Dublin hurling players to win an Inter-Provincial medal in 1988 at midfield. He has also represented Ireland GAA Masters in the International Rules Series in 2008 in Australia.

He is the last manager at St Vincents to win the Division One Minor Hurling Championship in 2002. In 2011 he managed the senior camogie team in St Vincents in which they won Division 1 league three times and were runners up in three championship finals. In 2014 he became a selector for the Dublin Camogie Senior team but had to resign due to family issues. He is also a regular contributor on Stadium Saturday with Dublin City FM about all things GAA in Dublin.

Juvenile Club honours 
 Minor Hurling Championship winners 1982, Minor Football Championship winners 1983
 Under 21 Football Championship winners 1984, U21 Hurling Championship winners 1983 & 1984

Adult Club Football 
 Senior Football Championship winners 1984 Leinster Club Championship winners 1984, All Ireland Club Runners up 1985, Adult Leagues winners Division 2,4,8,9 and 10.
 Junior C Football Championship winners 2006
 Junior D Football Championship winners 2007

Adult Club Hurling 
 Senior Hurling Championship winners 1988 1993
 Junior C Hurling Championship 2010
 Adult Division 1 League winners X 5
 Boland Cup 2000
 Two Inter City Tournament winners 2005, 2006

New York GAA 
 Played with Westmeath hurling and football club
 Hurling Senior Championship winners 1993, 1996
 Football Senior Championship winners 1996

Dublin 
 Played minor, U21 and senior for both hurling and football
 Played for Dublin senior hurling from 1983-1999. Won two Division 2 National Hurling League medals.
 played as sub for Dublin senior footballers (no games) 1991-1993
 Leinster Hurling Championship winners Under 14 1978
 Leinster Minor Hurling Championship winners 1983
 All Ireland runners up Minor hurling V Galway 1983
 Leinster Football Under 21 winners V Carlow 1984

Inter-Provincial 
 Represented Leinster from 1988 - 1990. He won an Interprovincial Railway Cup medal at midfield for hurling 1988.

Ireland 
Represented Ireland Masters against Australia International Rules Series in Australia 2008

References and Notes 

Dual players
St Vincents (Dublin) hurlers
Dublin inter-county Gaelic footballers
Living people
Hurlers
Leinster inter-provincial Gaelic footballers
Dublin inter-county hurlers
Year of birth missing (living people)